Maronite Catholic Eparchy of Notre-Dame du Liban de Paris (in Latin: Eparchia Dominae Nostrae Libanensis Parisiensis Maronitarum) is a Maronite Catholic diocese. It was erected on 21 July 2012 by Pope Benedict XVI who appointed Eparch Nasser Gemayel  as its first bishop. It had 50,300 baptized at the same year in 2013. The Eparchy has 9 churches.

Territory and statistics
The eparchy includes all Lebanese Maronite Catholic faithful in France. Its eparchial seat is the city of Paris, where is located the Our Lady of Lebanon of Paris Cathedral.

The territory is divided into four parishes and had 50,300 baptized in 2013.

History
Previously the Maronite faithful were under the jurisdiction of Ordinariate for Eastern Catholics in France, erected on 16 June 1954.
The Eparchy was erected on 21 July 2012 by Pope Benedict XVI's papal bull Historia traditiones. His eparch, Nasser Gemayel, was previously pastor of the parish of Saint Tekla in Masqua (Lebanon).

Eparchs
Nasser Gemayel (since 21 Jul 2012)

See also

Our Lady of Lebanon of Paris Cathedral
Maronite Catholic Church
Maronite Christianity in Lebanon

References

External links

 Eparchy of Notre-Dame du Liban de Paris (Maronite)
 Maronites.fr

2012 establishments in France
Christian organizations established in 2012
Christianity in Paris
Eastern Catholic dioceses in Europe
Our Lady of Lebanon of Paris
Organizations based in Paris
Eastern Catholic dioceses in France